Jonathan Thollander (born July 2, 1992) is a Swedish professional ice hockey player who currently plays for HV71 in the Swedish Elitserien.

References

External links

1992 births
HV71 players
Living people
Swedish ice hockey right wingers